Tamás Bognár (born 18 November 1978) is a Hungarian professional football referee. He has been a full international for FIFA since 2009.

References 

1978 births
Living people
Hungarian football referees